was a private junior college in Japan. It was located in Gotemba, Shizuoka. It was abolished in 2001.

Department and Graduate Course

Departments 
 Department of Japanese language and Japanese Literature
 Department of English and American literature

Advanced course 
 None

Educational institutions established in 1992
Japanese junior colleges
Private universities and colleges in Japan
Universities and colleges in Shizuoka Prefecture
1992 establishments in Japan